A. colombiana  may refer to:

 Aechmea colombiana, a bromeliad native to Ecuador
 Alvania colombiana, a marine sea snail in the family Rissoidae

See also 
 Colombiana (disambiguation)